The State Register of Heritage Places is maintained by the Heritage Council of Western Australia. , 120 places are heritage-listed in the Shire of Wyndham-East Kimberley, of which three are on the State Register of Heritage Places.

List
The Western Australian State Register of Heritage Places, lists the following three state registered places within the Shire of Wyndham-East Kimberley:

References

Wyndham
Wyndham